Chahar Kharvar (also Romanized as Chahār Kharvār; also known as Qeshlāq) is a village in Baba Aman Rural District, in the Central District of Bojnord County, North Khorasan Province, Iran. At the 2006 census, its population was 460, in 117 families.

References 

Populated places in Bojnord County